Chesters Hill Fort is an Iron Age hill fort in East Lothian, Scotland. The name "Chesters" comes from Latin castra, a fortified place.

This fortified village with its system of ramparts and ditches around a settlement of about twenty roundhouses is in the care of Historic Environment Scotland, who describe it as "one of the best-preserved examples in Scotland of an Iron age fort".

The hillfort was subject to a detailed programme of survey by Rampart Scotland.

Photo gallery

See also
 List of hill forts in Scotland
 List of places in East Lothian

References

 

History of East Lothian
Hill forts in Scotland
Former populated places in Scotland
Archaeological sites in East Lothian
Scheduled Ancient Monuments in East Lothian